The  is a museum in the city of Tokushima where visitors can learn about Awa Odori, watch displays of the dance and sample local products. It is located at the base of the 280m-high Mount Bizan.  The hall also acts as a gateway to neighboring Mount Bizan with the location of a ropeway station on Level five.

The building has a gift shop on its ground floor. The museum is on the third floor. Also located in the building is the hall where four daily shows of the Awa Odori are performed. The last of the shows, which begins in the late evening, is slightly more expensive than the others. One unique feature of the performances is the participation of audience members.

Until 1990, it was home to the Tokushima Prefectural Art Museum.

General information
Location
20 2-Chome Shinmachi Hashi
Tokushima City, Tokushima 770-0904
Japan

Hours of operation
9:00am – 5:00 pm (excluding Bizan ropeway, which operates until 5:30)
Closed the second and fourth Wednesday of each month, and the day after national holidays.
Closed 28 December - 1 January.

Layout

Level 1
The first floor of the hall is home to the information desk, with pamphlets and videos showing tourist information about Tokushima, and the "Arudeyo Tokushima" store with tourist goods, local produce and much more.

Level 2
The second floor is home to a dance stage that is open to performances throughout the day.

In addition to the dance hall, the second floor is also home to a library containing information relevant to the dance. Use of the library is free.

Level 3
The third level of the hall is home to an Awa Odori museum, where visitors can see clothing, instruments, and other items related to the dance. There is also an area where you can try dancing yourself, along with video instructions.

Level 4
The fourth level is an open area with rooms that can be rented for meetings, dance practice and other purposes.

Level 5
The fifth level of the hall is home to a small restaurant, and a ropeway station for those wanting to climb Mt. Bizan via cable car.

Bicycle rental

The Hall rents bicycles for sightseeing in the city.

References

Museums in Tokushima Prefecture
Performing arts museums
Culture in Tokushima Prefecture